West Haverstraw is a village incorporated in 1883 in the town of Haverstraw, Rockland County, New York, United States. It is located northwest of Haverstraw village, east of Thiells, south of the hamlet of Stony Point, and west of the Hudson River. The population was 10,165 at the 2010 census. The majority of the hamlet of Garnerville is contained in the village of West Haverstraw.

Geography
West Haverstraw is located at  (41.204594, -73.990665).

Demographics

As of the census of 2000, there were 10,295 people, 3,542 households, and 2,521 families residing in the village. The population density was 6,670.3 people per square mile (2,581.1/km2). There were 3,634 housing units at an average density of 2,354.5 per square mile (911.1/km2). The racial makeup of the village was 64.85% white, 12.80% African American, 0.55% Native American, 4.15% Asian, 0.10% Pacific Islander, 12.67% from other races, and 4.89% from two or more races. Hispanic or Latino of any race were 30.37% of the population.

There were 3,542 households, out of which 37.2% had children under the age of 18 living with them, 52.1% were married couples living together, 14.6% had a female householder with no husband present, and 28.8% were non-families. 24.2% of all households were made up of individuals, and 11.2% had someone living alone who was 65 years of age or older. The average household size was 2.87 and the average family size was 3.45.

In the village, the population was spread out, with 27.4% under the age of 18, 7.8% from 18 to 24, 32.2% from 25 to 44, 20.7% from 45 to 64, and 11.9% who were 65 years of age or older. The median age was 35 years. For every 100 females, there were 92.2 males. For every 100 females age 18 and over, there were 86.3 males.

The median income for a household in the village was $48,420, and the median income for a family was $55,964. Males had a median income of $37,532 versus $29,333 for females. The per capita income for the village was $19,879. About 7.9% of families and 10.6% of the population were below the poverty line, including 13.4% of those under age 18 and 12.6% of those age 65 or over.

As of the 2010 census, the population of West Haverstraw was 10,165 and the demographics were as follows:

 40.9% Hispanic
 36.3% White
 16.2% Black
 0.1% Native American
 4.5% Asian
 0.0% Native Hawaiian
 0.2% Some other race
 1.8% Two or more races

Transportation
Local transit is operated by Transport of Rockland. The village is served by the #91, #94, #95, and #97 routes.

Short Line, part of Coach USA, provides daily service along U.S. Route 9W heading to and from the Port Authority Bus Terminal in Midtown Manhattan and West Point Military Academy or Newburgh.

Tourism

Historical markers
 Treason House - Route 9W - Long Clove Congers - Haverstraw, near where Route 304 runs into Route 9W. On the night of September 21–22, 1780, Major John André landed at this point to confer with Maj. Gen. Benedict Arnold, who gave secret information about West Point fortifications and forces to André. At dawn, the conspirators adjourned to the Belmont House, owned by Thomas Smith and occupied by his brother Joshua Hett Smith in West Haverstraw, to complete their plans. "Clove" is from Dutch for "pass."
 Crossroads - Route 9W and West Railroad Avenue
 Col. A. H. Hay - Route 9W
 Samsondale - 40 South Route 9W

Landmarks and places of interest

 Fraser-Hoyer House (NRHP)
 Paul Piperato Haverstraw Bay Park
 Haverstraw Marina
 Helen Hayes Hospital, rehabilitation hospital named after its benefactor, the actress Helen Hayes
 Henry M. Peck House Site (NRHP)
 Peck's Pond

Notable person
Steward Ceus, Haitian-American footballer currently playing for Minnesota United FC in the North American Soccer League.

References

External links
 Village of West Haverstraw official website

Villages in New York (state)
Villages in Rockland County, New York
New York (state) populated places on the Hudson River
Populated places on the Hackensack River